The William M. McMurry House is a historic mansion in Springfield, Tennessee, U.S.. It was built in 1896 for William M. McMurry, "the founder of McMurry Loose Leaf Tobacco Company." It became a bed and breakfast in 2016, but was sold to Lisa and Jon Arnold as a private residence in 2017.  It was listed on the National Register of Historic Places in 2017.

References

Houses completed in 1896
Buildings and structures in Robertson County, Tennessee
National Register of Historic Places in Robertson County, Tennessee
Houses on the National Register of Historic Places in Tennessee